Charles Robinson "Chick" Davies (March 1900 – April 15, 1985) was an American basketball coach. He served as the head men's basketball coach at Duquesne University from 1924 to 1948, compiling a record of 314–106.  Davies' teams played in one NCAA tournament and three National Invitation Tournaments.  He led Duquesne to the 1940 NCAA Final Four as well as the 1940 NIT championship game, where the Dukes lost to Colorado.  Davies was born in March 1900 in New Castle, Pennsylvania.  He died on April 15, 1985, in Pittsburgh, Pennsylvania.

Head coaching record

See also
 List of NCAA Division I Men's Final Four appearances by coach

References

1900 births
1985 deaths
Basketball coaches from Pennsylvania
Basketball players from Pennsylvania
Duquesne Dukes men's basketball coaches
Duquesne University alumni
People from New Castle, Pennsylvania
American men's basketball coaches
American men's basketball players